Station Group Gardermoen  (Norwegian: Gardermoen flystasjon) is located about 50 km north of Oslo, Norway. It is colocated with Norway's main airport, Oslo Airport, Gardermoen.

335 Squadron and 717 Squadron of the Royal Norwegian Air Force are stationed at Gardermoen, which operates respectively C-130J-30 Super Hercules transport aircraft and Dassault Falcon 20 electronic warfare aircraft.

History
The Norwegian Army started using Gardermoen as a camp already in 1740, when it was called Fredericksfeldt. The first flight took place in 1912, and by 1920 there were multiple hangars at the airport.

During the German invasion of Norway in World War II the Germans bombed the airport, but built it up with two 2000-meter runways during the war.

The military airport was founded on December 1, 1996, with new installations for 1,2 billion NOK. The airfield is built to easily expand cheaply and fast whenever needed. On October 8, 1998 the main airport serving Oslo was moved from Fornebu to Gardermoen. The new airport had among other facilities two runways.

The Air Force was considering moving its operations at Gardermoen to Rygge Air Station by consent of the Chief of Defence of Norway, General Sigurd Frisvold in the 2003-2004 period; however, this proposition was turned down by the Norwegian Parliament's Defence Committee. Thus, the air station currently remains operational.

Footnotes

External links
 Air Force page on Gardermoen Air Station (in Norwegian)

Royal Norwegian Air Force stations
Airports in Viken
1912 establishments in Norway
Airports established in 1912
Luftwaffe airports in Norway
Oslo Airport, Gardermoen
Military installations in Viken